This is a list of episodes for the PBS television series The Woodwright's Shop starring Roy Underhill. The typical season is 13 episodes and starts towards the end of September or early October. The series was first broadcast only on North Carolina's PBS channel. After two years, the series was broadcast nationally.

North Carolina Season 1 (1979)

North Carolina Season 2 (1980)

PBS Season 1 (1980)
The opening credits for the first eight seasons consisted of Roy Underhill walking across a busy street with a toolbox in his left hand, and a felling axe in his right. The next scene shows a man kicking the meter, as Roy is walking past a bunch of people. The next scene shows Roy walking on the road. After that, Roy is walking past a police car, and it shows him walking on the train tracks. And then, it shows Roy walking in the forest, and it shows him walking to its final destination, the shop. He puts the axe and toolbox down as the show's title appears, and he enters the shop.

PBS Season 2 (1982)

PBS Season 3 (1983)

PBS Season 4 (1984)

PBS Season 5 (1985)

PBS Season 6 (1986)
The 100th episode of The Woodwright's Shop airs.

PBS Season 7 (1987)

PBS Season 8 (1988)
This is the last season with the old Woodwright's Shop opening and closing themes.

PBS Season 9 (1989)
The current Woodwright's Shop opening sequence was introduced starting with this season. This time, it shows Roy walking past a bunch of people, and it pans over to see two female police officers. The next scene shows Underhill walking past his dog named "Grit", and rubs it in the next shot. You cannot see the axe in his toolbox when he passes the dog. He walks across the pond near and pass someone fishing. He tilts his hat by looking at the camera, and finally reaching its destination, the shop. We pan up to the show's logo being carved.

PBS Season 10 (1990)

PBS Season 11 (1991)

PBS Season 12 (1992)
This is the last season of the series where Roy takes his hat off when he enters the shop.

PBS Season 13 (1993)
Starting with this season and continuing into today, Roy no longer takes his hat off when he enters the shop. He decided to keep his hat on when he enters the shop.

PBS Season 14 (1994)
The 200th episode of The Woodwright's Shop airs.

PBS Season 15 (1995)

PBS Season 16 (1996)

PBS Season 17 (1997)

PBS Season 18 (1998)

PBS Season 19 (1999)

PBS Season 20 (2000)

PBS Season 21 (2001)

PBS Season 22 (2002)
The 300th episode of The Woodwright's Shop airs.

PBS Season 23 (2003)
Steve Latta makes his first appearance on the show.

PBS Season 24 (2004)

PBS Season 25 (2005)

PBS Season 26 (2006)

PBS Season 27 (2007)

PBS Season 28 (2008)

PBS Season 29 (2009)
The 400th episode of The Woodwright's Shop airs.

PBS Season 30 (2010)

PBS Season 31 (2011)

PBS Season 32 (2012)

PBS Season 33 (2013)

PBS Season 34 (2014)

PBS Season 35 (2015)

PBS Season 36 (2016)

PBS Season 37 (2017)

References

Lists of American non-fiction television series episodes